3, also known as Three, is an American progressive rock band formed in Woodstock, New York, United States, in the early 1990s.

History
The band was founded in 1994 as a three piece: Joey Eppard on guitar and lead vocals, Josh Eppard on drums and Chris Bittner on bass. They came to the attention of Universal Records after well-received performances at the Woodstock festival in 1994, eventually getting signed in 1998, but following an unstable relationship with the label through its series of corporate mergers, the band was left with little prospect of releasing their album. Eventually, the band decided to release it on Planet Noise Records, a small indie label, and thenceforth managed themselves independently, until their 2005 signing with Metal Blade, on whose label they re-released Wake Pig in late 2005. Their career has been marked by several line-up changes, most notably Josh Eppard's departure to join Coheed and Cambria; the two bands used to be regular touring partners. The band has toured nationally several times, and have appeared on radio stations throughout the United States. Joey Eppard also has an active solo career and released a solo album, Been to the Future, in 2002.

When questioned about the band's name in an interview with Rock Something, Joey Eppard stated that they considered changing the name of the band several times, but always decided to keep the name 3. According to the same interview, the name of the band originally stems from Joey Eppard's own "fascination" with the number: "It is a reference to the construct of our reality as having predominantly 3 aspects. For example, we live in a 3 dimensional universe on the third planet from the sun, experiencing time as past, present and future in a form that consists of mind, body and spirit."

In separate tours in May and October 2007 the band toured with the British progressive rock group Porcupine Tree, on their Fear of a Blank Planet North American tour. 3 also went on the road with 1980s rock band Scorpions, and later finished up the second leg of the Fear of a Blank Planet tour with Porcupine Tree.

The music video for the song "All That Remains" was voted the No. 16 Video of 2007 on MTV2's Headbanger's Ball. It was directed, shot and animated by David Brodsky.

They were a part of the "Progressive Nation '08" tour with Dream Theater, Opeth, and Between the Buried and Me.

Their fifth studio album, Revisions, a compilation of re-recordings of never before released songs as well as selections from their first two studio albums, was released on October 27, 2009. At the time it was planned to be their final release on Metal Blade Records. They have already started to play a couple of their new songs ("One with the Sun" and "You are the Alien") at their live shows dating back to tours from late 2008. The band was due to record and release their next studio album for Roadrunner Records, but were subsequently dropped before any production began.

They have since re-signed with Metal Blade Records and released their sixth studio album The Ghost You Gave to Me on October 11, 2011.

Style

The band themselves describe their music as "dark yet uplifting, spiritual without any connection to religion". Their music is punctuated by dark, sometimes incomprehensible lyrics, often rather detached from the accompanying music. Joey Eppard is considered a highly competent guitarist with a unique, primarily self-taught flamenco/slap hybrid guitar technique.

Over the course of 3's discography, the band has covered a wide variety of music genres. This spectrum of style includes the following songs as examples of each genre: hip hop (Don't Even), R&B (You Call Me Baby), rockabilly (Paint by Number), blues (Bedroom in Hell), reggae (Brother), funk (Get 2Gether), psychedelic (Signs of Life), metal (These Iron Bones), pop rock (Live Entertainment), acoustic rock (Careless Kim), punk (Sawed Off Shotgun), progressive (Monster), flamenco (Bramfatura), experimental progressive (Dregs), rock 'n roll (One Way Town), soft rock (Lay Down the Law), pop (Soul Reality), folk (The Game), experimental (Broadway Alien), progressive funk (Leaving on the Light), and progressive metal (Only Child). The genre-defying diversity of their music is what gives them the self-proclaimed title of a hybrid band, though the band is currently in a state consisting primarily of progressive metal on their newest album The Ghost You Gave To Me. However, though the album does focus heavily on progressive metal, there remain many influences from other genres within the music, including some country vibes in the musicality of "The Barrier".

Members

Current
Joey Eppard – lead vocals, acoustic & electric guitars (1994–present)
Billy Riker – guitars, effects (1999–present)
Chris "Gartdrumm" Gartmann – drums, backing vocals (1999–present)
Daniel Grimsland – bass, backing vocals (2004–present)

Former
Josh Eppard – drums, percussion, backing vocals (1994–1999)
Chris Bittner – bass (1994–2003)
Jason Foster – guitars (1999)
Joe Cuchelo – bass (2003–2004)
Joe Stote – keyboards, percussion (2003–2008)

Discography

Sampler
Wake Pig sampler (2005)

Singles
"Sugarlife" (2014, Bandcamp)
"You Are The Alien" (2014, Bandcamp)
"One Way Town" (Live at The Anchor) (2014, Bandcamp)
"It's Alive" (Live at The Bearsville Theater) (2014, Bandcamp)
"Woodchuck Truck" (2014, Bandcamp)
"Crazy Eyes" (2015, Bandcamp)
"The End is Begun" (Live at The Anchor) (2015, Bandcamp)

Studio albums
Paint by Number (1999, Planet Noise Records)
Summercamp Nightmare (2003, Planet Noise Records)
Wake Pig (2004, Planet Noise Records) 2005, Metal Blade Records)
The End Is Begun (2007, Metal Blade Records)
Revisions (2009, Metal Blade Records)
The Ghost You Gave to Me (2011, Metal Blade Records)

Live albums
Half Life (2002, Planet Noise Records)

EPs
These Iron Bones (2007, iTunes exclusive)

Compilation albums
Where Woodstock Lives (1994, Tinker Street)
Metal Massacre Vol. 13 (2006, Metal Blade)

References

External links 

 
 

3
Metal Blade Records artists
Musical groups established in 1994
1994 establishments in New York (state)